Tobias "Toby" Mao (born December 21, 1988) is a former world-class Rubik's Cube solver. Hailing from Hillsborough, California, Toby graduated from Crystal Springs Uplands School in 2007 and went on to study mathematics at Northwestern University in Evanston, Illinois. He is the younger brother of Beauty and the Geek second-season participant Tyson Mao, with whom he taught Will Smith to solve a Rubik's Cube for the 2006 film The Pursuit of Happyness. In 2006, Toby set the world record in speedcubing by solving the 3x3x3 cube in 10.48 seconds.

References

External links
Cube conqueror: Freshman Toby Mao's special talent - North by Northwestern
Photo of Toby and Tyson Mao
YouTube - Rubik's Cube Former World Record

1988 births
American people of Taiwanese descent
Living people
American people of Chinese descent
People from Hillsborough, California